Mphiwa Dlamini is an Eswatini politician. He is a member of the Pan-African Parliament and the House of Assembly of Eswatini.

References

Year of birth missing (living people)
Living people
Members of the Pan-African Parliament from Eswatini
Members of the House of Assembly of Eswatini